Christophe Atangana Assimba (born 2 March 2000) is a Cameroonian footballer who plays as a goalkeeper for Gabala.

Club career
Atangana started his career with Spanish La Liga side Athletic Bilbao, having lived in the city since childhood. In 2016 he made his senior debut for Basconia, Athletic's farm team, in the fourth tier.

In 2018, he was promoted to the reserve team Bilbao Athletic but was deemed to be only the fourth choice (behind Unai Etxebarria, Hodei Oleaga and Ander Iru) and was sent on loan to local third tier club Leioa where he was backup to the more experienced Urtzi Iturrioz. At the start of 2019–20 Atangana found himself behind new signings Jokin Ezkieta and Julen Agirrezabala in the selection queue in Bilbao and returned to Leioa, but again played rarely so switched to Somorrostro (fourth tier) mid-season in search of more match action, only for that campaign to be curtailed by the COVID-19 pandemic. He spent the 2020–21 season on loan at Arenas (third tier) but was unable to displace Diego Carrio as the regular starting goalkeeper.

In August 2021, after being released by Athletic Bilbao, Atangana signed for Gabala in Azerbaijan. On 10 December 2021, he debuted for Gabala during a 2–1 win over MOIK.

International career
Atangana was selected for the Cameroon under-20 team for the 2019 Africa U-20 Cup of Nations qualification fixtures, in which his team eliminated Uganda over two legs but lost to Mali.

Career statistics

Club

References

External links
 

Cameroonian footballers
Spanish footballers
Gabala FC players
Athletic Bilbao footballers
CD Basconia footballers
Living people
2000 births
Association football goalkeepers
SD Leioa players
Arenas Club de Getxo footballers
Segunda División B players
Tercera División players
Cameroon youth international footballers
Cameroonian emigrants to Spain
Expatriate footballers in Azerbaijan
Spanish expatriate footballers
Cameroonian expatriate footballers
Cameroonian expatriate sportspeople in Azerbaijan
Spanish expatriate sportspeople in Azerbaijan
Footballers from Douala
Footballers from Bilbao
Spanish sportspeople of African descent